Korean International School, HCMC is a South Korean international school in Tan Phu Ward, District 7, Ho Chi Minh City, Vietnam. The school serves kindergarten through senior high school.

It was established on August 4, 1998.

As of 2017 it is the second largest South Korean international school in the world, followed by the Jakarta International Korean School.

See also
 Koreans in Vietnam

References

External links
 Korean International School, HCMC

International schools in Ho Chi Minh City
Korean international schools in Vietnam
Educational institutions established in 1998
1998 establishments in Vietnam